The 2017 Greek Basket League Playoffs included the top eight place finishing teams of the 2016–17 Greek Basket League regular season.

Bracket

Teams in bold won the playoff series. Numbers to the left of each team indicate the team's original playoff seeding. Numbers to the right indicate the score of each playoff game.

First round

In the first round, the teams that finished in places 5 to 8 of the regular season standings, playing against each other have to win two games to win the series. Thus, if one team wins two games before all three games have been played, the remaining game is omitted. The team that finished in the higher regular season place, plays the first and the third (if necessary) game of the series at home.

Game 1

Game 2

Game 3

Quarterfinals

In the quarterfinals, teams playing against each other have to win two games to win the series. Thus, if one team wins two games before all three games have been played, the remaining game is omitted. The team that finished in the higher regular season place, is going to play the first and the third (if necessary) game of the series at home.

Game 1

Game 2

Semifinals

In the semifinals, teams playing against each other have to win three games to win the series. Thus, if one team wins three games before all five games have been played, the remaining games are omitted. The team that finished in the higher regular season place, is going to play the first, the third and the fifth (if necessary) game of the series at home.

Game 1

Game 2

Game 3

Game 4

Third place

In the series for the third place, teams playing against each other have to win three games to win the series. Thus, if one team wins three games before all five games have been played, the remaining games are omitted. The team that finished in the higher regular season place, is going to play the first, the third and the fifth (if necessary) game of the series at home.

Game 1

Game 2

Game 3

Finals

In the finals, teams playing against each other have to win three games to win the series. Thus, if one team wins three games before all five games have been played, the remaining games are omitted. The team that finished in the higher regular season place, is going to play the first, the third and the fifth (if necessary) game of the series at home.

Game 1

Game 2

Game 3

Game 4

Game 5

References

External links
 Official Basket League Site 
 Official Basket League Site 

2016–17 in Greek basketball